Ustye Yaman-Yelgi (Yamanyılğa tamağı) is a rural locality (a village) in Krasnoklyuchevsky Selsoviet, Nurimanovsky District, Bashkortostan, Russia. The population was 12 as of 2010. There is 1 street.

Geography 
Ustye Yaman-Yelgi is located 34 km north of Krasnaya Gorka (the district's administrative centre) by road. Yaman-Port is the nearest rural locality.

References 

Rural localities in Nurimanovsky District